Cheshmeh Sefid or Chashmeh Sefid or Chashmeh Safid or Cheshmeh-ye Sefid or Cheshmehsefid may refer to:

Fars Province
Cheshmeh Sefid, Sepidan, a village in Sepidan County
Cheshmeh Sefid, Hamaijan, a village in Sepidan County

Kerman Province

Kermanshah Province
Cheshmeh Sefid, Dalahu, a village in Dalahu County
Cheshmeh Sefid-e Sofla, Kermanshah, a village in Dalahu County
Cheshmeh Sefid, Javanrud, a village in Javanrud County
Baskeleh-ye Cheshmeh Sefid, a village in Gilan-e Gharb County County
Cheshmeh Sefid-e Rutavand, a village in Gilan-e Gharb County County
Cheshmeh Sefid-e Usin, a village in Gilan-e Gharb County County
Cheshmeh Sefid, Mahidasht, a village in Kermanshah County
Cheshmeh Sefid-e Aqabeygi, a village in Kermanshah County
Cheshmeh Sefid, Ravansar, a village in Ravansar County
Cheshmeh Sefid, Sarpol-e Zahab, a village in Sarpol-e Zahab County
Cheshmeh Sefid, Sonqor, a village in Sonqor County

Kohgiluyeh and Boyer-Ahmad Province

Kurdistan Province
Cheshmeh Sefid, Kurdistan, a village in Bijar County

Lorestan Province
Cheshmeh Sefid, Darb-e Gonbad, Lorestan Province
Cheshmeh Sefid, Tarhan, Lorestan Province
Cheshmeh Sefid-e Olya, Lorestan Province
Cheshmeh Sefid-e Sofla, Lorestan

Markazi Province
Cheshmeh Sefid, Markazi

Razavi Khorasan Province

Semnan Province
Cheshmeh Sefid, Shahrud, Shahrud County, Semnan Province
Cheshmeh Sefid, Meyami, Meyami County, Semnan Province

See also